Konstantinos "Kostas" Rougalas (born 13 October 1993) is a Greek professional footballer who plays as a centre-back for Super League 2 club Panachaiki.

Club career
Born in Patras, Rougalas first played football for Thyella Patras F.C. He joined Olympiacos' youth setup in 2007, aged 14. In September 2013, he moved to Ergotelis in a season-long loan deal.

After making no appearances for Ergotelis, Rougalas moved to Fostiras on 25 January of the following year, also in a temporary deal. He made his professional debut six days later, starting in a 3–0 home win against Asteras Magoula.

Rougalas scored his first professional goal on 16 March 2014, netting the first of a 2–0 away win against Paniliakos. He appeared in 21 matches during the campaign, as his side missed out promotion in the play-offs.

On 13 August 2014 Rougalas moved abroad for the first time in his career, joining Atlético Madrid in a one-year loan deal. He was assigned to the reserves in Segunda División B.

On 9 February 2015, Rougalas penned a two and a half-year deal with Football League side Iraklis. On 1 July 2015 he was released by Iraklis  and one day later he was signed by Oud-Heverlee Leuven, where he was reunited with his former Fostiras' coach Jacky Mathijssen. On the summer of 2016, he released his contract in a mutual content with Oud-Heverlee Leuven.

On 20 January 2017, he signed a six months' contract with the Romanian club Târgu Mureș for an undisclosed fee. On 28 June 2017, after six months in Romania, he signed a two years' contract with Belgian First Division B club Westerlo for an undisclosed fee. On 31 August 2018, he signed a contract with Football League club Doxa Drama for an undisclosed fee  and the next season for another Football League club Panachaiki.
In 2020 he joined the hellenic football club Diagoras.

References

External links

1993 births
Living people
Footballers from Patras
Greek footballers
Greece youth international footballers
Association football defenders
Football League (Greece) players
Super League Greece 2 players
Olympiacos F.C. players
Ergotelis F.C. players
Segunda División B players
Atlético Madrid B players
Greek expatriate footballers
Greek expatriate sportspeople in Spain
Expatriate footballers in Spain
Iraklis Thessaloniki F.C. players
Oud-Heverlee Leuven players
K.V.C. Westerlo players
Doxa Drama F.C. players
Diagoras F.C. players
Belgian Pro League players
Challenger Pro League players
Expatriate footballers in Belgium
Liga I players
ASA 2013 Târgu Mureș players
Liga II players
FC Dunărea Călărași players
Greek expatriate sportspeople in Romania
Expatriate footballers in Romania
Fostiras F.C. players